Reshaun Walkes (born November 7, 1999) is a Canadian professional soccer player who plays as a forward for Toronto FC II in MLS Next Pro.

Early life
He played youth soccer with Ajax SC, Dixie SC, Richmond Hill SC, and Erin Mills SC. During his youth, he attended tryouts with the Toronto FC Academy, but ultimately did not make the team.

College career
He began his post-secondary career in 2017 at Sheridan College, where he scored five goals in nine games. He played one season at Sheridan, highlighted by a goal in the first 40 seconds of a playoff match against Cambrian College.

After a year in Canada, he decided to attend school in the United States, moving to Lewis and Clark Community College in 2018, with whom he played for two seasons, scoring ten goals and adding eight assists in 2018, followed by 17 goals with 11 assists in 2019. During his time at Lewis and Clark, he was name a Third Team NCJAA All-American, a two-time All-Region First Team Honoree, a two-time United Soccer Coaches First Team honoree and Region 24 Player of the Year.

After two years with Lewis and Clark, he transferred to the University of Texas Rio Grande Valley in 2020, where he played for the men's soccer team, earning All-WAC Second Team honours in his first year, after finishing second on the team in goals, points, shots, and shots on goal. He scored a hat trick in the 2021 season opener on August 26 the Central Arkansas Bears, earning school Student-Athlete of the Week honours. In his second season, he led the Vaqueros in goals, assists, points, shots, shots on goal, and game winning goals. After the season, he was named to the All-WAC Second Team for the second consecutive year.

Club career
In 2018 and 2019, he played with Master's FA in League1 Ontario, scoring six goals in 17 appearances. He scored his first goal on July 7, 2018 against ProStars FC. Later that season, on July 28, he scored a brace in a 2-2 draw with Ottawa South United. The following season, he scored a hat trick against FC London on June 9, 2019 in a 4-3 victory.

In 2021, he played with the Des Moines Menace in USL League Two, scoring once in the regular season against FC Wichita on June 24. In the playoffs, he earned Goal of the Week honours after self-assisting himself on a header goal against Kalamazoo FC. He won the USL League Two that season with the Menace.

In 2022, he was drafted by his hometown Toronto FC at the 2022 MLS SuperDraft. After attending pre-season with Toronto FC, he ultimately signed a contract with the second team Toronto FC II for the 2022 season in MLS Next Pro. He scored his first professional goal in a 4-2 victory over FC Cincinnati 2 on April 30. On August 7, he scored a brace against Orlando City B.

Career statistics

References

1999 births
Living people
Canadian soccer players
Soccer people from Ontario
League1 Ontario players
USL League Two players
Master's FA players
Des Moines Menace players
Toronto FC II players
MLS Next Pro players
Soccer players from Brampton
UT Rio Grande Valley Vaqueros men's soccer players